The 1992 FIBA Europe Under-18 Championship was an international basketball  competition held in Hungary in 1992.

Final ranking
1. 

2. 

3. 

4. 

5. 

6. 

7. 

8. 

9. 

10. 

11.

Awards

External links
FIBA Archive

FIBA U18 European Championship
1992–93 in European basketball
1992 in Hungarian sport
International youth basketball competitions hosted by Hungary